Evelyn Neill Foote Marriott (born October 16, 1947) is an American religious leader and was the second counselor in the general presidency of the Young Women organization of the Church of Jesus Christ of Latter-day Saints (LDS Church) from 2013 to 2018.

Personal life
She was born in Alexandria, Louisiana, has a degree in English literature from Southern Methodist University, and later worked as a secretary at Harvard University. 

While at Harvard, she met David Marriott, who introduced her to the LDS Church. She was baptized into the LDS Church and about a year later began dating Marriott. They were married in the Salt Lake Temple in June 1971 and are the parents of 11 children.

LDS Church service
Among other callings in the church, Marriott has served as a stake and ward Relief Society president and ward Young Women president.  From 2002 to 2005, Marriott served with her husband while he was president of the church's Brazil São Paulo Interlagos Mission.

Marriott was called as the second counselor to Bonnie L. Oscarson in 2013 and served until 2018. Marriott's four addresses in the church's general Relief Society Meeting or General Conference included Abiding in God and Repairing the Breach and Yielding Our Hearts to God. Marriott was also a part of the change to a General Women’s Meeting for LDS Church--marking the first time that women, young women and girls have been invited to come together.

In February 2015, Marriott participated with other LDS Church leaders at a press conference in favor of bills protecting people from housing and employment discrimination based on sexual orientation, while also addressing the need for protection of religious liberty. Marriott also was one of the church's representatives at a meeting announcing a bill incorporating these principles being introduced to the Utah legislature in March 2015. In 2018 she presented at the International Center for Law and Religion Studies conference a talk entitled, What Can a Lay Person Do to Protect Religious Freedom? and spoke about her father, a judge, attorney, and member of the board at the First Methodist Church in Alexandria, Louisiana.

References

External links
Neill F. Marriott Official profile

1947 births
21st-century Mormon missionaries
American leaders of the Church of Jesus Christ of Latter-day Saints
American Mormon missionaries in Brazil
Converts to Mormonism
Counselors in the General Presidency of the Young Women (organization)
Female Mormon missionaries
Harvard University staff
Living people
Mission presidents (LDS Church)
People from Alexandria, Louisiana
Southern Methodist University alumni
Latter Day Saints from Louisiana
Latter Day Saints from Massachusetts